The Sarfatti Building is an office and educational building on the Bocconi University campus in Milan, Italy at Via Sarfatti 25.

History 
The construction of the building, designed by Italian architect Giuseppe Pagano and his associate Gian Giacomo Predaval, commenced in 1937. The inauguration was held on December 21, 1941. The structure was the first built and corresponds to the original nucleus of the Bocconi University campus after its seat was moved from a palazzo in largo Treves in Milan.

Description 
The building is considered one of the finest works of Italian Rationalist architecture.

It features a cross-shaped plan, probabibly inspired from Walter Gropius' Bauhaus Dessau (1925-1926). Two lion statues, created by sculptor Arturo Martini done in medieval style preside over the interior of building's main entrance hallway. Below the porch alongside via Sarfatti some bas-reliefs by Leone Todi can be found.

Gallery

See also
Roentgen Building
New SANAA Campus

References

External links

Buildings and structures in Milan
Bocconi University